Manus MacCloskey (April 24, 1874 – May 11, 1963) was a brigadier general in the United States Army. He served in the Philippines, participated in the China Relief Expedition, and commanded the 12th Field Artillery Regiment during World War I.  After retiring from the military, he organized the Civilian Conservation Corps in North Carolina and later served as superintendent of Cook County Hospital in Chicago.

Early life
He was born in Pittsburgh, Pennsylvania on April 24, 1874. MacCloskey graduated from the United States Military Academy in 1898.

Military career

After his commissioning, he joined the Fifth Field Artillery on April 26, 1898. In 1916, he commanded Fort Myer

He served in the Philippines and participated in the China Relief Expedition.

During World War I, he organized and commanded the 12th Field Artillery Regiment.  MacCloskey fought in the Battle of Verdun, the Battle of Château-Thierry (1918), the Battle of Belleau Wood, and the Battle of Soissons (1918).

From January 1921 to June 30, 1924, he served with the General staff at Headquarters, Sixth Corps Area.  He later served at Fort Sheridan and Fort Bragg.  He retired from military service on April 30, 1938.

Civilian career
In 1933, he organized the Civilian Conservation Corps (CCC) in North Carolina.  He served as superintendent of Cook County Hospital in Chicago from 1938 to 1947.

Awards and honors
Awards he received during his career include the Distinguished Service Medal, the Silver Star with oak leaf cluster, and the Purple Heart with oak leaf cluster. He also received the Order of the Crown of Italy, rank Officer for his World War I service.

Personal life and family
He married Sara Monro on August 14, 1901. They had two children: Monro MacCloskey, who attained the rank of brigadier general in the United States Air Force, and Sara, who was known as Sally.

Death
He died on May 11, 1963, in Washington, DC. He is buried at Arlington National Cemetery.

Legacy
In 1977, MacCloskey's personal papers were donated to the University of Pittsburgh archives by Monro MacCloskey.

References

Military personnel from Pittsburgh
Recipients of the Distinguished Service Medal (US Army)
Recipients of the Silver Star
American military personnel of the Spanish–American War
United States Army generals of World War I
United States Army generals
1874 births
1963 deaths
Burials at Arlington National Cemetery
United States Army Field Artillery Branch personnel
American people in the American Philippines
American expatriates in China